Meza mabillei, Mabille's three-spot missile, is a butterfly in the family Hesperiidae. It is found in Guinea, Sierra Leone, Liberia, Ivory Coast, Ghana, Nigeria and Gabon. The habitat consists of forests.

Adults are attracted to flowers.

References

Butterflies described in 1893
Erionotini
Butterflies of Africa